Mid Armagh was a constituency of the Parliament of Northern Ireland.

Boundaries
Mid Armagh was a county constituency comprising the south central part of County Armagh. It was created when the House of Commons (Method of Voting and Redistribution of Seats) Act (Northern Ireland) 1929 introduced first-past-the-post elections throughout Northern Ireland. Mid Armagh was created by the division of Armagh into four new constituencies. The constituency survived unchanged, returning one member of Parliament, until the Parliament of Northern Ireland was temporarily suspended in 1972, and then formally abolished in 1973.

The seat was centred on the town of Armagh and included parts of the rural districts of Armagh, Newry and Tandragee.

Politics 
The seat was always won by Ulster Unionist Party candidates.  It was contested on four occasions, by members of the Ulster Liberal Party and People's Democracy and by two independent Unionist candidates, all of whom took less than 30% of the votes cast.

Members of Parliament

Election results 

At 1933 Northern Ireland general election, John Clarke Davison was elected unopposed.

At the 1938 by-election and 1945, 1949, 1953, 1958 and 1962 Northern Ireland general elections, (Sir) Norman Stronge was elected unopposed.

References

Historic constituencies in County Armagh
Northern Ireland Parliament constituencies established in 1929
Constituencies of the Northern Ireland Parliament
Northern Ireland Parliament constituencies disestablished in 1973